Alfred Maul (1870–1942) was a German engineer who could be thought of as the father of aerial reconnaissance. Maul, who owned a machine works, experimented from 1900 with small solid-propellant sounding rockets.

Background
Although people had long been experimenting with rockets, hardly anyone had used them in a practical application. It was Alfred Maul, an industrialist and engineer born in Pößneck, in the Duchy of Saxe-Meiningen, that thought of, and implemented, the idea of taking photographs of the land with a rocket-attached camera. He was inspired by Ludwig Rahrmann, who in 1891 patented a means of attaching a camera to a large calibre artillery projectile or rocket. Previously, aerial photographs had been taken from balloons and kites, and in 1896 or 1897 by Alfred Nobel's rocket, from a small rocket at 100 metres altitude. In 1903 Julius Neubronner's pigeons were used to take aerial photos but found to be too unreliable.

Camera rocket development
In 1903, Alfred Maul patented his Maul Camera Rocket. The camera would be launched into the air with a black powder rocket. When the rocket had reached an altitude of about 600 to 800 meters, a few seconds later, its top would spring open and the camera would descend on a parachute. A timer would trigger the taking of the photograph.

In 1904, Maul managed to image the local landscape from a 600-metre altitude.

A military application for Maul's technique was intended and, on 22 August 1906, a secret demonstration occurred before military observers at the Glauschnitz firing range. Maul developed his camera rocket further for the purpose of military reconnaissance. He began attaching gyroscopic-stabilized plate cameras in 1907.

In 1912, his rocket cameras were using a 20 by 25 centimetre photographic plate and gyroscopic steering to ensure stable flight and sharper images. The rocket weighed 41 kilograms.

Aeroplanes take over
Maul's rockets achieved no military significance because conventional aeroplanes during World War I succeeded in the role of aerial reconnaissance. The Deutsches Museum in Munich displays a Maul-built rocket.

References

External links
 

1864 births
1941 deaths
People from Pößneck
People from Saxe-Meiningen
German aerospace engineers
Photographers from Thuringia
Aerial photographers
Aerial reconnaissance pioneers
Engineers from Thuringia